The 2018 Golden Joystick Awards was the 36th edition of the Golden Joystick Awards, an annual awards event that honored the best video games of that year. The event was hosted by comedian Danny Wallace, and took place at the Bloomsbury Big Top in London on November 16, 2018.

Awards and nominations
Titles in bold won their respective category.

References

2018 awards
2018 awards in the United Kingdom
2018 in video gaming